The Bud Light Cup Series (BLC) was the first tour and in its first year was the only tour of the Professional Bull Riders (PBR). When other tours were created, it became the major league tour of the PBR.

Background 
This series ran from 1994 to 2002. It was the inaugural and only tour at its time of inception, as the PBR started their inaugural season in 1994. This series became the elite series of the PBR. The entire series was telecast on TNN. Each event used three judges – except for the PBR Bud Light Cup World Championships, which had four – with two typically scoring up to 50 points each, and a reserve judge to provide a tiebreaking score if needed. Two-day events featured two preliminary rounds in which the top 45 bull riders who each rode one bull per night; the top 15 riders by score from these preliminaries rode in a short go-round, called the Built Ford Tough Championship round in 2002, on the second night. The rider who had the highest score total from his three rides was the event winner. One day events followed the same format but only had one preliminary round.

Riders were drawn for each bull ahead of an event and then posted a few days prior. By 2002, Livestock Director Cody Lambert was working with a minimum of 20 stock contractors in order to have around six contractors featuring approximately 75 bulls at each event.
Upon conclusion of the PBR's regular season, the 45 bull riders who had earned the most money in Bud Light Cup Series and Challengers Tour events combined qualified for the PBR Bud Light Cup World Finals in Las Vegas. The Qualifier Standings showed which riders were in the hunt for a berth to the Bud Light Cup World Finals. Once the finalists were at the World Finals; however, the World Champion was determined by Bud Light Cup Points won throughout the season.

The points system was a very thorough one that ensured the most consistent rider of the season was proclaimed the champion. Bud Light Cup points were awarded only at Bud Light Cup events. They were calculated by using the ride score and adding any bonus points for the Standings position in each round and the event overall position. The World Champion Bull Rider title and the gold buckle went to the rider with most Bud Light Cup points.

Source:

Inaugural season (1994) 
After a small series of PBR-sanctioned events took place in 1993, the organization had its first official season with a year-end world finals event in 1994. There were eight regular season events, as well as the World Finals. The world championship race was based on points won throughout the season. The regular-season stops ranged from one-day to three-day events. There were 30 contestants in each stop. All would ride in the regular long rounds, then the top 15 riders with the highest combined scores returned to the Championship Round.

The inaugural PBR World Finals took place at Las Vegas, Nevada’s MGM Grand Garden Arena. There were 46 contestants at the two-day event. All would ride in Rounds 1 and 2, then the top fifteen point-earners competed in the Championship Round. Throughout the years, more events were added to the PBR schedule.

1995 season changes 
The 1995 season was the first and only one in which the world championship race was based entirely on money won throughout the season. This was also the year that the PBR’s first minor league tour, the Touring Pro Division was introduced, making the televised Bud Light Cup Series the PBR’s elite series.

There were now 30 contestants at the World Finals: the top 20 money-earners from the Bud Light Cup Series, as well as the top 10 money-earners from the Touring Pro Division. It was a six-round event where all contestants rode in the first five rounds, then the top fifteen point-earners rode in the Championship Round.

1996 season changes 
Starting in 1996, the PBR reduced the maximum number of go-rounds in an event from four to three (meaning now, two long rounds and the Championship Round). Also, the number of riders on the BLC series increased from 30 to 45, and the top 45 money-earners based on money won at all PBR-sanctioned events would qualify for the World Finals. Also, the world championship race returned to a point system.

The World Finals was now a five-round event where all contestants rode in the first four rounds, then the top fifteen returned for the Championship Round.

This was the first season where a million dollars in prize money would be offered at the World Finals.

1997 season changes 
Starting with the BLC event in Billings, Montana, the PBR adopted a half-point scoring system in their events (whereas in prior seasons they scored rides in whole points), a change that would remain in place until the end of the 2005 Built Ford Tough Series season (when a quarter-point system would be implemented full-time).

1999 season changes 
After five years at the MGM Grand Garden Arena, the PBR World Finals moved to Las Vegas’ Thomas and Mack Center.

2000 season changes 
A new rule was put in place, called the "World Champion's Exemption", where former PBR world champions could compete in as many or as few elite series events as they chose (while still needing to qualify for the World Finals by earning enough money like all other riders).

See also
Professional Bull Riders
Built Ford Tough Series
Unleash the Beast Series

References

Bibliography

External links 
 PBR World Finals
 Professional Bull Riders

Sports in Pueblo, Colorado
Professional Bull Riders
Rodeo in the United States
Bull riders
Bucking bulls
Equestrian sports competitions in the United States
Rodeo competition series
Anheuser-Busch beer brands
Sports competitions in Las Vegas
1994 establishments in the United States
2002 disestablishments in the United States